Ortensio Zecchino (born 20 April 1943) is an Italian academic and politician, former Minister of University and Research.

Biography 
After teaching History of Medieval Institutions at the Suor Orsola Benincasa University of Naples, Zecchino joined the Christian Democracy and was elected regional councilor of Campania, holding the seat from 1970 to 1979, until he has been elected to the European Parliament.

In 1987 Zecchino has been elected for the first time to the Senate and held the seat in Palazzo Madama until 2001.

In 1998 Zecchino joined the D'Alema I Cabinet in which he has been appointed Minister of University and Research and kept the leadership of the ministry in the D'Alema II Cabinet and the Amato II Cabinet.

Zecchino left the PPI in 2001 when the party was federated into The Daisy, and joined Sergio D'Antoni's European Democracy.

He has ever been living in Ariano Irpino where he is heading BioGeM ("Biology and Molecular Genetics") and CESN ("European Centre for Norman Studies").

References

External links 
Official website
Files about his parliamentary activities (in Italian): X, XI, XII, XIII legislature.

1943 births
Living people
People from Asmara
People of former Italian colonies
People from Ariano Irpino
Christian Democracy (Italy) politicians
Italian People's Party (1994) politicians
European Democracy politicians
20th-century Italian politicians
21st-century Italian politicians
Government ministers of Italy